1937 in philosophy

Events

Publications 
 E. E. Evans-Pritchard, Witchcraft, Oracles and Magic Among the Azande [Note: This work starts the so-called 'rationality debates' in anthropology and philosophy.]
 Talcott Parsons, The Structure of Social Action
 Bernard Shaw, The Intelligent Woman's Guide to Socialism and Capitalism (Pelican Books paperback edition)
 Charles Stevenson, The Emotive Meaning of Ethical Terms

Births 
 January 17 - Alain Badiou 
 June 5 - Hélène Cixous 
 June 19 - André Glucksmann 
 July 3 - Tom Stoppard 
 July 4 - Thomas Nagel

Deaths 
 March 6 - Rudolf Otto (born 1869)
 March 15 - H. P. Lovecraft (born 1890)
 April 27 - Antonio Gramsci (born 1891)
 May 28 - Alfred Adler (born 1870)

References 

Philosophy
20th-century philosophy
Philosophy by year